Thomas Orde Lawder Wilkinson VC (29 June 1894 – 5 July 1916), was an English-born Canadian and British Army officer who was a recipient of the Victoria Cross (VC), the highest and most prestigious award for gallantry in the face of the enemy that can be awarded to British and Commonwealth forces. A soldier with the Loyal North Lancashire Regiment during the First World War, he was posthumously awarded the VC for his actions on 10 July 1916, during the Battle of the Somme.

Early life
Wilkinson was born on 29 June 1894, the second son of Charles Orde Wilkinson and his wife, Edith, at Lodge Farm on Dudmaston estate near Bridgnorth in Shropshire, England. He attended Parkside School in Surrey and then Wellington College where he showed both academic and athletic prowess. He graduated in November 1912 by which time the Wilkinson family had emigrated to Vancouver in British Columbia, Canada, where his father had been working at the time of his birth.

First World War
Shortly after the outbreak of the First World War, Wilkinson joined the 16th Battalion (Canadian Scottish) at Vancouver. He had been working as a surveyor at the time of his enlistment. He was soon commissioned as a lieutenant. After the regiment arrived in England he transferred to the 7th Battalion, Loyal North Lancashire Regiment and by the start of 1916 was serving on the Western Front as a gunnery officer.

Wilkson's battalion was part of the 56th Infantry Brigade, 19th Division, which was involved in the opening stages of the Battle of the Somme. During the battle, on 4 July 1916, his battalion was attacking the village of La Boisselle. A neighbouring unit had conceded ground and Wilkinson's battalion was ordered to retake the position. A machine-gun had been left behind, which Wilkinson put into operation on reaching the position. He was able to hold off an attacking party of Germans until reinforcements arrived. He was killed shortly afterwards trying to bring a wounded soldier into cover. For his actions, he was posthumously awarded the Victoria Cross (VC).  The VC, instituted in 1856, was the highest award for valour that could be bestowed on a soldier of the British Empire. The citation for Wilkinson's VC read: 

As his body was never recovered, Wilkinson is commemorated with thousands of other British and Commonwealth soldiers on the British Memorial to the Missing at Thiepval. His name is also on the Sandwick War Memorial, in British Columbia. In 2004 a plaque to his memory was unveiled at the church in Quatt, near his place of birth. The plaque was commissioned by the Shropshire War Memorials Association after unsuccessful attempts to locate relatives of Wilkinson.

Victoria Cross
King George V presented Wilkinson's VC to his father on 26 November 1916, in a ceremony at Buckingham Palace. He was also entitled to the 1914–15 Star, the British War Medal, and the Victory Medal. His VC and other medals are displayed at the Imperial War Museum in London.

Notes

References

Further reading 
Monuments to Courage (David Harvey, 1999)
The Register of the Victoria Cross (This England, 1997)
VCs of the First World War – The Somme (Gerald Gliddon, 1994)

External links 
Thomas Orde Lawder Wilkinson's digitized service file
Thiepval Memorial
 Legion Magazine article on Thomas Orde Lawder Wilkinson
 
 

1894 births
1916 deaths
People from Bridgnorth
People educated at Wellington College, Berkshire
Canadian Battle of the Somme recipients of the Victoria Cross
Loyal Regiment officers
British Army personnel of World War I
British military personnel killed in the Battle of the Somme
British emigrants to Canada
Canadian Militia officers
Canadian Expeditionary Force officers
Canadian Scottish Regiment (Princess Mary's) officers
British Army officers
British Army recipients of the Victoria Cross
Canadian military personnel of World War I
Military personnel from Shropshire
People educated at Parkside School, Cobham